{{DISPLAYTITLE:C25H37NO4}}
The molecular formula C25H37NO4 (molar mass: 415.56 g/mol, exact mass: 415.2723 u) may refer to:

 Bimatoprost
 Piericidin A
 Salmeterol